Hwung Hwung-hweng (10 November 1946 – 26 July 2019) was a Taiwanese hydraulic engineer, university president, and political administrator.

Academic career
Hwung was born in 1946. He received a bachelor's degree from National Cheng Kung University in 1970, and completed his graduate education at the same institution, earning a doctorate in 1981. Upon graduation, Hwung joined the NCKU faculty, and was eventually named senior executive vice president. He was named NCKU president in October 2010, and formally assumed office in February 2011, succeeding Michael M. C. Lai. Hwung also took Lai's position on the Southeast and South Asia and Taiwan Universities Presidents’ Forum. Hwung supported a proposal for Taiwanese universities to accept more Chinese students, as long as admissions standards were not compromised. In January 2014, Hwung wrote an open letter advising against the renaming of a campus plaza to South Banyan Square, citing laws on educational neutrality, as the given name of activist Cheng Nan-jung had political connotations. University students led a demonstration on campus to protest his remarks. He continued teaching at the university and in May 2015, spoke out regarding the need for the government to develop better water management policies.

Political career
He was named chairman of the Aviation Safety Council in December 2015. In this position, he oversaw an investigation into the causes of aviation incidents and undertook additional safety research. He backed calls for an agency independent of the Ministry of Transportation and Communications to probe all transportation incidents. In January 2018, Hwung stated that the government should establish a maritime agency to handle Taiwan's exclusive economic zone. The Ocean Affairs Council began operations in April, with Hwung as founding chairman.

Death
Hwung died at National Cheng Kung University Hospital on 26 July 2019, aged 72.

References

1946 births
2019 deaths
20th-century Taiwanese engineers
National Cheng Kung University alumni
Academic staff of the National Cheng Kung University
Hydraulic engineers
21st-century engineers
Presidents of universities and colleges in Taiwan
21st-century Taiwanese politicians
Government ministers of Taiwan